Pișcolt is a commune of 3,285 inhabitants situated in Satu Mare County, Crișana, Romania. It is composed of three villages: Pișcolt, Resighea (Reszege) and Scărișoara Nouă (Piskolcliget).

The village Resighea was first attested in a document from 1215; as such, it is the oldest settlement in the county. The village Scărișoara Nouă was founded in 1924 by settlers who came from Scărișoara, Alba County  and other places in the Apuseni Mountains.

Demographics
Ethnic groups (2002 census):
Romanians: 61.90%
Hungarians: 24.39%
Romanies (Gypsies): 13.26%

According to mother tongue, 62.67% of the population speak Romanian, while 37.08% speak Hungarian as their first language.

Natives
 Claudiu-Lucian Pop

References

Communes in Satu Mare County
Localities in Crișana